Kebirita is a monotypic genus of flowering plants belonging to the family Fabaceae. The only species is Kebirita roudairei.

Its native range is Northern Africa to Mauritania.

References

Loteae
Monotypic Fabaceae genera